Guitar Man is an album by guitarist Hank Marvin, released in 2007.

Track listing

Personnel 
 Lead guitar, arranger, producer – Hank B. Marvin
 Rhythm guitar, keyboards, arranger – Gary Taylor
 Rhythm guitar – Ben Marvin
 Rhythm guitar – Phil Watts
 Keyboards, accordion – Nunzio Mondia
 Bass guitar – Roy Martinez
 Drums, percussion – Ric Eastman
 Percussion – Chris Tarr
 Recording and mixing – Les Williams
 Mastering – Geoff Pesche

Charts

Weekly charts

Year-end charts

References

2007 albums